This is a discography of the English progressive rock band Yes. Over the years they have released 23 studio albums, 18 live albums, 37 compilation albums, 41 singles, and 23 videos.

Albums

Studio albums

Additional studio recordings

Live albums

Compilation albums

Singles

Notes

Music videos
 "Everydays" (1970)
 "Then" (1970)
 "No Opportunity Necessary, No Experience Needed" (1970)
 "Astral Traveler" (1970)
 "Wonderous Stories" (1977)
 "Don't Kill the Whale" (1978)
 "Madrigal" (1978)
 "Tempus Fugit" (1980)
 "Into the Lens" (1980)
 "Owner of a Lonely Heart" (1983)
 "Leave It" (1984)
 "It Can Happen" (1984)
 "Hold On" (Live) (1985)
 "Rhythm of Love" (1987)
 "Love Will Find a Way" (1987)
 "Lift Me Up" (1991)
 "Don't Go" (2001)
 "We Can Fly" (2011)
 "The Ice Bridge" (2021)
 "Dare To Know" (2021)
 "Future Memories" (2021)
 "A Living Island" (2022)
 "Cut From the Stars" (2023)

Videos

Other member appearances 

Members of Yes have collaborated together in a number of other albums and singles. The list includes releases with at least three (current or former) Yes members, and excludes releases by the Yes offshoots Yes Featuring Jon Anderson, Trevor Rabin, Rick Wakeman and Anderson Bruford Wakeman Howe.

 1973: The Six Wives of Henry VIII by Rick Wakeman, with appearances by Squire, Howe, White and Bruford
 1973: E.H. in the U.K., by Eddie Harris, with appearances by Squire, White and Kaye
 1975: Fish Out of Water, by Chris Squire, with appearances by Bruford and Moraz
 1975: Beginnings, by Steve Howe, with appearances by Bruford, White and Moraz
 1976: Ramshackled, by Alan White, with appearances by Anderson and Howe
 1977: Rick Wakeman's Criminal Record, by Rick Wakeman, with appearances by Squire and White
 1979: The Steve Howe Album, by Steve Howe, with appearances by Bruford, White and Moraz
 1984: Welcome to the Pleasuredome, by Frankie Goes to Hollywood, with Horn, Howe and Rabin
 1986: Liverpool, by Frankie Goes to Hollywood, with Horn, Howe and Rabin
 1991: The Classical Connection II by Rick Wakeman, including an archival track with Squire, Bruford and Howe
 1995: Tales from Yesterday, a Yes tribute album, with appearances by Howe, Banks, Moraz and Sherwood
 1999: Encore, Legends, & Paradox, produced by Robert Berry and drummer Trent Gardner, with 10 covers of ELP by multiple musicians including Banks, Khoroshev and Downes
 2000: Conspiracy by Chris Squire & Billy Sherwood, with White on 2 tracks
 2002: Pigs & Pyramids-An All Star Lineup Performing The Songs Of Pink Floyd – track 3 "Comfortably Numb" performed by Squire, White and Sherwood, while Sherwood and Kaye appear on other tracks
 2005: Back Against the Wall, a Pink Floyd tribute, produced by Billy Sherwood, with Squire, Howe, White, R Wakeman, Kaye, Sherwood and Downes, among others
 2006: Return to the Dark Side of the Moon, a Pink Floyd tribute, produced by Billy Sherwood, with R Wakeman, Howe, Kaye, White, Bruford, Banks and Downes, among others
 2007: CIRCA: 2007, by CIRCA:, including Sherwood, Kaye and White; also including material co-written by Rabin
 2007: From Here to Infinity, a project led by Billy Sherwood including appearances by Kaye, R Wakeman, Howe and White on a cover of Yes' "Starship Trooper"
 2008: Led Box: The Ultimate Tribute to Led Zeppelin, with Sherwood, Kaye, R Wakeman and Downes, among others
 2009: Abbey Road: A Tribute to The Beatles, produced by Billy Sherwood, with Kaye, White and Downes, among others
 2012: Songs of the Century: An All-Star Tribute to Supertramp, a tribute album organised by Sherwood, with appearances by Squire, Kaye, R Wakeman, Banks and Downes, among others
 2012: The Prog Collective, a project led by Billy Sherwood including appearances by Squire, Banks, R Wakeman and Kaye, among others
 2012: The Fusion Syndicate, a project led by Billy Sherwood including appearances by R Wakeman and Kaye, among others
 2012: A Spoonful of Time, by Nektar, with appearances by Howe, Moraz, R Wakeman, Downes and Sherwood, among others
 2012: Who Are You: An All Star Tribute to The Who, a tribute album with appearances by R Wakeman, Banks and Sherwood, among others
 2013: Epilogue by The Prog Collective, a project led by Sherwood, with Squire, Moraz and others
 2013: In Extremis, by Days Between Stations, with Sherwood, R Wakeman and Banks
 2014: Light My Fire – A Classic Rock Salute to The Doors, a The Doors tribute, produced by Billy Sherwood, with Howe, R Wakeman, Kaye, Moraz and Downes, among others
 2015: Citizen, by Billy Sherwood, with Squire, R Wakeman, Kaye, Downes, Moraz and Davison
 2018: Be Well, Be Safe, Be Lucky... The Anthology, by Peter Banks, with Kaye and Sherwood
 2018: "Difference" (single), by Edison's Lab (produced by Bill Duncan, Kurt Schweizer, Wendy Wood, Billy Sherwood and Jon Davison), with Kaye, Sherwood and Davison
 2018: A Life in Yes: The Chris Squire Tribute, with Sherwood, Kaye, Davison and Moraz, among others
 2018: Yesterday and Today: A 50th Anniversary Tribute to Yes by Dave Kerzner & Sonic Elements, with Sherwood, Kaye, Downes and Davison, among others
 2019: 1000 Hands by Jon Anderson, with Squire, Howe and White, among others
 2020: Crossover by David Cross & Peter Banks, with Banks, Kaye, Downes, Sherwood, O Wakeman
 2020: A Tribute to Keith Emerson & Greg Lake, tribute album produced by Billy Sherwood, with Moraz, Davison and Downes
 2020: Worlds on Hold by The Prog Collective, a project led by Sherwood, with Davison, Moraz and others

See also
 List of Yes band members
 List of Yes concert tours

References

External links
Progrography: unofficial Yes discography
Yescography: unofficial Yes discography

Discographies of British artists
Rock music group discographies
Discography